The 1956 United States Senate election in Iowa took place on November 6, 1956. Incumbent Republican Senator Bourke B. Hickenlooper was re-elected to a third term in office over Democrat Rudolph M. Evans.

General election

Candidates
Rudolph M. Evans (Democratic), former member of the Federal Reserve Board of Governors
Bourke B. Hickenlooper, incumbent Senator since 1945 (Republican)

Results

See also 
 1956 United States Senate elections

References 

1956
Iowa
United States Senate